Battle of Mantinea may refer to one of several battles fought near Mantineia (Mantinea) in Ancient Greece:

Battle of Mantinea (418 BC), victory of Sparta against an alliance of Argos and Athens
Siege of Mantinea (385 BC), victory of Sparta 
Battle of Mantinea (362 BC), victory of Thebes against Sparta, although its general Epaminondas died
Battle of Mantinea (207 BC), victory of the Achaean League against the Spartan tyrant Machanidas